James Wallace & the Naked Light is an American folk/rock band based in Nashville, Tennessee. The band's influences include American gospel music, Paul Simon, and The Kinks. They have performed at the Bonnaroo Music Festival and the Summer Camp Music Festival. The group's leader, James Wallace, has toured and co-written songs with banjo player Abigail Washburn. Brittany Howard of Alabama Shakes lists them as one of her favorite live acts. In 2013, they recorded a Daytrotter Session and their video "To The River" was chosen as a Vimeo "Staff Pick."

Discography

I Smile All Day I Smile All Night (2009)

Track listing
1. This Song
2. Dancing Star (No Naked Light)
3. Smoke, Love, Smoke
4. Killing The Dog
5. Sheep Stare From The Hill
6. The Bench
7. Saved At The Bottom
8. When You Pass Through The Valley
9. Colors

More Strange News From Another Star (2013)

Track listing
1. The Wind's Too Cold
2. Colored Lights
3. Worse Things Have Happened
4. To The River
5. He'd Like To Hear It Once Again
6. 4th Dimension or Living in Colorado
7. The Wire (Reprise) / Kicked Down the Road
8. Everything Past Mars
9. The Coming (Shark's Song)
10. Chopping Block

References

External links 

Alternative rock groups from Tennessee
American folk rock groups